Serbia sent two athletes that competed in the 1912 Summer Olympics in Stockholm, Sweden. This was the first and only games where participated the Olympics as an independent nation until the 2008 Summer Olympics. By the next Olympic Games in 1920, Serbian athletes competed for the Kingdom of the Serbs, Croats and Slovenes, which in 1929 changed its name to Yugoslavia (YUG).

Athletics

Three athletes represented Serbia in athletics in the nation's debut at the sport and the Olympics. 

Ranks given are within that athlete's heat for running events.

References
 
 
 

Nations at the 1912 Summer Olympics
1912
Olympics